Lincoln is a city in Burleigh County, North Dakota, United States. It is a suburb of adjacent Bismarck, and also a core city of the Bismarck-Mandan Metropolitan Statistical Area. The population was 4,257 at the 2020 census, making it the fourteenth largest city in North Dakota. Lincoln was founded in 1977.

Geography

Demographics

2010 census
As of the census of 2010, there were 2,406 people, 821 households, and 660 families living in the city. The racial makeup of the city was 94.6% White, 0.9% African American, 2.0% Native American, 0.1% Asian, 0.1% from other races, and 2.2% from two or more races. Hispanic or Latino of any race were 0.5% of the population.

There were 821 households, of which 51.3% had children under the age of 18 living with them, 63.8% were married couples living together, 9.6% had a female householder with no husband present, 6.9% had a male householder with no wife present, and 19.6% were non-families. 14.4% of all households were made up of individuals, and 2.6% had someone living alone who was 65 years of age or older. The average household size was 2.93 and the average family size was 3.22.

The median age in the city was 29.6 years. 32% of residents were under the age of 18; 8.3% were between the ages of 18 and 24; 35.9% were from 25 to 44; 20% were from 45 to 64; and 3.7% were 65 years of age or older. The gender makeup of the city was 51.3% male and 48.7% female.

2000 census
As of the census of 2000, there were 1,730 people, 527 households, and 452 families living in the city. The population density was 1,700.3 people per square mile (654.9/km2). There were 541 housing units at an average density of 531.7 per square mile (204.8/km2). The racial makeup of the city was 97.46% White, 0.23% African American, 1.50% Native American, 0.06% from other races, and 0.75% from two or more races. Hispanic or Latino of any race were 0.23% of the population.

There were 527 households, out of which 63.2% had children under the age of 18 living with them, 67.9% were married couples living together, 13.9% had a female householder with no husband present, and 14.2% were non-families. 11.4% of all households were made up of individuals, and 1.5% had someone living alone who was 65 years of age or older. The average household size was 3.28 and the average family size was 3.53.

In the city, the population was spread out, with 40.2% under the age of 18, 6.8% from 18 to 24, 37.2% from 25 to 44, 13.6% from 45 to 64, and 2.2% who were 65 years of age or older. The median age was 27 years. For every 100 females, there were 100.2 males. For every 100 females age 18 and over, there were 99.0 males.

The median income for a household in the city was $38,884, and the median income for a family was $40,703. Males had a median income of $28,417 versus $18,438 for females. The per capita income for the city was $13,233. About 3.1% of families and 3.8% of the population were below the poverty line, including 5.3% of those under age 18 and 5.7% of those age 65 or over.

Politics
The current mayor is the honorable  L. Wise.

Climate
This climatic region is typified by large seasonal temperature differences, with warm to hot (and often humid) summers and cold (sometimes severely cold) winters.  According to the Köppen Climate Classification system, Lincoln has a humid continental climate, abbreviated "Dfb" on climate maps.

References

Cities in Burleigh County, North Dakota
Cities in North Dakota
Populated places established in 1977